Mimi Coertse, DMS (born 12 June 1932) is a South African soprano.

On 26 January 2020, Mimi was also inaugurated as a living legend in the South African Legends Museum. She was one of only 20 South African legends of whom a bust was also made.

Early life

Coertse, born in Durban, matriculated at the Helpmekaar Girls High School in Johannesburg. She began vocal studies in South Africa in 1949. Her first vocal coach in Johannesburg was Aimee Parkerson.

Her debut performance in South Africa was singing Handel's Messiah at the Johannesburg City Hall on 11 December 1951. In July 1953 she married broadcaster and composer Dawid Engela. She left South Africa in September 1953 for London, and then went via The Hague to Vienna. In January 1954 she started training with Maria Hittorff and Josef Witt.

Opera career

Coertse made her debut in January 1955 as the "first flower girl" in Wagner's Parsifal at the Teatro San Carlo in Naples, Karl Böhm conducting. She also sang in Basle at the Teatro San Carlo. On 17 March 1956 she made her debut at the Vienna State Opera as the Queen of the Night in Die Zauberflöte by Mozart and remained with the Vienna State Opera until 1978. Her Covent Garden debut was in 1956, in the same role.

Her roles were limited in the United Kingdom as the Equity boycott of South Africa due to Apartheid, prevented its members from having anything to do with South Africa's  entertainment industry.

Coertse sang the soprano part in Bach's Matthäus-Passion at Fritz Wunderlich's first appearance in Vienna in 1958, when he performed the tenor arias with Julius Patzak singing the Evangelist. In 1958, Coertse and Fritz Wunderlich again worked together at the Aix-en-Provence festival in Die Zauberflöte.

In 1965, she sang Konstanze in Die Entführung aus dem Serail at the Vienna State Opera which also featured Fritz Wunderlich as Belmonte. In 1966, Mimi was honoured by the President of Austria with the title Österreichischer Kammersänger, for her ten years of work as a permanent member at the Vienna State Opera.

Her repertoire also includes:

 The Magic Flute (Wolfgang Amadeus Mozart) – Queen of the night
 Il Seraglio (Wolfgang Amadeus Mozart) – Constance
 Ariadne auf Naxos (Richard Strauss) – Najade, later Zerbinetta
 Rigoletto (Giuseppe Verdi) – Gilda
 The Tales of Hoffmann (Jacques Offenbach) – Olympia, Antonia, Giulietta, Stella
 Palestrina (Hans Pfitzner) – the Angel
 Carmen (Georges Bizet) – Frasquita
 Martha (Friedrich von Flotow) – Martha
 Mignon (Ambroise Thomas) – Philine
 La traviata (Giuseppe Verdi) – Violetta
 I Pagliacci (Ruggiero Leoncavallo) – Nedda
 Arabella (Richard Strauss) – Fiaker-Milli
 Bastien und Bastienne (Wolfgang Amadeus Mozart) – Bastienne
 The Merry Widow (Franz Lehár) – Hanna Glawari
 Lucia di Lammermoor (Gaetano Donizetti) – Lucia
 Die Fledermaus (Johann Strauss II) – Rosalinde
 L'heure espagnole (Maurice Ravel) – Concepcion, staging Otto Schenk
 Don Giovanni (Wolfgang Amadeus Mozart) – Donna Elvira
 La bohème (Giacomo Puccini) – Musetta
 Norma (Vincenzo Bellini) – Norma
 Così fan tutte (Wolfgang Amadeus Mozart) – Fiordiligi
 Falstaff (Giuseppe Verdi) – Mrs. Alice Ford
 Turandot (Giacomo Puccini) – Liu, a young slave
 Don Giovanni (Wolfgang Amadeus Mozart) – Donna Anna
 Die schweigsame Frau (Richard Strauss) – Aminta, Timida 1968 Premiere Vienna State Opera, staging Hans Hotter
 Die ägyptische Helena (Richard Strauss) – Aithra
 Daphne (Richard Strauss) – Daphne
 Don Carlos (Giuseppe Verdi) – Elisabeth von Valois

Later years

Since returning to South Africa in 1973, she has been a regular guest on South African stages and also a frequent broadcaster on radio and television. She returned to the Vienna State Opera for a single farewell performance as Elisabetta in Don Carlo on 14 December 1978.

In recent years, she has devoted her time to exposing young South African singers to the neglected art of Lieder singing which can be artistically even more demanding than opera singing. Her support for her fellow South African musicians has been outstanding – as may be witnessed in her Debut with Mimi and through the Mimi Coertse Bursary.

In 1996, Austria's Federal Ministry for Science and Art awarded her the Austrian Decoration for Science and Art (Austrian Honour, first class) honour, the highest honour an artist can receive in that country.

In 1998, she received an honorary doctorate from the University of Pretoria and another in 2013 from the Unisa. In 2002 she would receive the Golden Rathausmann from the mayor of Vienna.

In 1998, Coertse and Neels Hansen founded The Black Tie Ensemble, a development project which enables young, classically trained singers to bridge the gap between training and professional performance.

This project has developed into the most exciting classical singing ensemble in South Africa, and is now on the brink of becoming a vibrant, new, young opera company. A project for future stars of Africa! The Ensemble, sponsored by Sappi, performs operas at the State Theatre (Pretoria), Walter Sisulu National Botanical Garden (Johannesburg) and the Civic Theatre (Johannesburg).

On 26 January 2020, Mimi was also inaugurated as a living legend in the South African Legends Museum. She was one of only 20 South African legends of whom a bust was made.

Personal life 

Coertse was married three times. Coertse's first marriage was to South African composer Dawid Engela in 1953 but the marriage ended in divorce in 1957. Her second marriage was to Italian businessman Diego Brighi in 1965 but this marriage ended in divorce in 1969. Her last marriage was to a South African businessman, Werner Ackerman, in 1970 and lasted until 1994. After five miscarriages, she adopted a son and daughter, Werner and Mia.

Honours and awards

 1961: Medal of Honour of the South African Academy for Science and Art (Suid-Afrikaanse Akademie vir Wetenskap en Kuns) 
 1966: Title of Kammersängerin
 1985: Decoration for Meritorious Services (South Africa) in recognition of her contribution to the Arts
 August 1996: Austrian Cross of Honour for Science and Art
 1998: Honorary Doctor of Philosophy (h.c.) from the University of Pretoria, South Africa
 2002: Golden "Rathausmann"
 In 2004: Voted 45th in the Top 100 Great South Africans
 In 2008: Mimi Coertse Museum van Afrikaans opened at HAP - Huis van Afrikaanse Poësie in Capital Park, Pretoria.
 2012: 1 July–30 September: special exhibition in Staatsoper museum Vienna: "Mimi Coertse, a Viennese woman from South Africa"
 2020: Inaugurated as a living legend in the South African Legends Museum. She was one of only 20 legends from whom a bust was also made.

References

Literature

 Helmuth Furch, 'Die Wiener Jahre von Kammersängerin Mimi Coertse,' ('The Viennese years of Kammersängerin Mimi Coertse'), Bulletin of Museums- und Kulturverein Kaisersteinbruch No. 41, 20–56, March 1996: also 'Mimi Coertse, die hochgeschätzte Konzert- und Liedsängerin' ('A reverence for a great Concert- and Lieder-singer'), ibid. No. 52, 33–54, December 1998.
 Helmuth Furch, Eva Hilda Smolik and Elfriede Werthan, Kammersängerin Mimi Coertse, eine Wienerin aus Südafrika (Kammersängerin Mimi Coertse, a Viennese woman from South Africa) (with a preface by Marcel Prawy), (Vienna 2002).

1932 births
Living people
Musicians from Durban
Afrikaans-language singers
Afrikaner people
20th-century South African women opera singers
South African operatic sopranos
University of Pretoria alumni
Classical music radio presenters
Recipients of the Austrian Cross of Honour for Science and Art
Österreichischer Kammersänger
South African radio presenters
South African women radio presenters